Signalling may refer to:

Cell signaling, signalling between biological cells
Signalling (economics), part of contract theory
Signal processing, subfield of electrical engineering
Signalling theory, a theory within evolutionary biology

See also
Signal (disambiguation)